The flag of Morocco is the flag used by the government of Morocco and has served as the national flag of Morocco since 17 November 1915. It has a red field with a green pentagram in the centre. The green star represents the five pillars of Islam, and the red represents the blood of the ancestors and unity.

Red has considerable historic significance in Morocco by proclaiming the descent from the royal 'Alawid dynasty. The ruling house was associated with the Islamic prophet Muhammad via Fatimah, the wife of Ali, the fourth Muslim Caliph. Red is also the colour that was used by the sharifs of Mecca and the imams of Yemen. Since the 17th century, Morocco is ruled by the 'Alawid dynasty, and the first flags of the country were plain red. 

On 17 November 1915,  Sultan Yusef signed a dhahir that made Morocco's flag red with a green interlaced pentangle. 

While Morocco was under French and Spanish control, the red flag with the seal in the centre remained in use but only inland since its use at sea was prohibited. When independence was restored in 1955, it once again became the national flag.

The pentagram represents the Seal of Solomon, an Islamic symbol. The five branches also represent the pillars of Islam.

Design
The legal definition of the flag specifies that the colours are bright red and palm green. No more precise colour specifications are known to be published. The RGB colours used in the illustration on the Kingdom's website are listed below, along with rough CMYK and Pantone equivalents for printing.

Construction sheet

History
In the 17th century, when Morocco became ruled by the current 'Alawid dynasty, its flag was solid red at first. The Sharifs of Makkah used that as a reference colour.

It was certified by the Guinness Book of World Records as the largest flag ever draped.

Historical national flags

Other historical flags

Other national flags

See also
 Coat of arms of Morocco
 List of Moroccan flags

References

External links

 Morocco Historical Flags, FOTW

Morocco
National symbols of Morocco
Flags of Morocco
Morocco